Vacation is the second studio album by American rock band the Go-Go's, released on July 20, 1982, by I.R.S. Records. The album reached number eight on the Billboard 200, and has been certified gold by the Recording Industry Association of America (RIAA). The title track reached number eight on the Billboard Hot 100. The Go-Go's were riding high at the time of the album's first release, their prospects to all outward appearances looking bright. Future problems were beginning to take shape, as the members' drug use and internal fighting began to escalate.

The single "Vacation" was also issued as perhaps the first cassette single ever. In addition to the title track, two more singles were pulled from the album at the time: "Get Up and Go" and "This Old Feeling", the former of which peaked at number 50 on the Billboard Hot 100. The song "Speeding", which is not included on the album, is a Caffey/Wiedlin composition used as B-side of the single for "Get Up and Go".

Cash Box called "Get Up and Go" a "rousing pop/rocker", saying that "the rhythm is as peppy as the title would indicate."  Billboard called it a "spirited pop/rock anthem" that is "invigorating" despite not being as "seamless" or having as much "mass appeal" as the preceding hit single "Vacation".  Detroit Free Press critic Gary Graff called it a "beach party pop tune."

Rolling Stone critic Ken Tucker called "This Old Feeling" a "perfect pop song: an ethereal melody is anchored by Kathy Valentine's bass as Carlisle's voice skims the surface of a pleasant memory just beyond reach" and said that "Rarely has the woozy pleasure of a good daydream been rendered more movingly in rock music."

In 2016, Edsel Records reissued remastered deluxe editions, all with bonus tracks, of the Go-Go's original three releases.

Track listing

Personnel

The Go-Go's
 Charlotte Caffey – lead guitar, keyboards, back-up vocals
 Belinda Carlisle – lead vocals
 Gina Schock – drums, percussion, back-up vocals
 Kathy Valentine – bass guitar, back-up vocals
 Jane Wiedlin – rhythm guitar, back-up vocals

Additional musicians
 Steve Berlin – saxophone on "This Old Feeling"

Technical
 Richard Gottehrer – production
 Thom Panunzio – recording, mixing
 James Ball, Stuart Furusho, David Leonard, Neil Pedinoff – recording assistance
 Greg Calbi – mastering

Artwork
 Mick Haggerty – art direction, design, photography
 Ginger Canzoneri – art direction

Charts

Certifications

Notes

References

1982 albums
Albums produced by Richard Gottehrer
Epic Records albums
The Go-Go's albums
I.R.S. Records albums
Illegal Records albums